Carlos Rodwell Rusere (born 5 December 1994) is a Zimbabwean footballer who plays as a midfielder for the Zimbabwe national team.

Club career
Rusere started his career in the youth ranks at Dynamos before being promoted into the senior squad and subsequently loaned out to second tier outfit DC Academy. Rusere returned to Dynamos at the end of 2015. He was released by Dynamos at the end of 2017. Ahead of the 2018 campaign, Rusere joined Shabanie Mine. However, months later he was signed by Nichrut.

On 1 February 2019, Rusere joined CAPS United. He was released at the end of the year.

International career
Rusere has made six appearances for the Zimbabwe national team and scored once. Before entering the senior international fold, Rusere was a part of the Zimbabwe U23s and started in a 2–1 defeat away to Nigeria U23s. He also played in the 2013 COSAFA U-20 Cup, scoring against Botswana.

Career statistics

International
.

International goals
. Scores and results list Zimbabwe's goal tally first.

References

1994 births
Living people
Zimbabwean footballers
Zimbabwe international footballers
Dynamos F.C. players
Shabanie Mine F.C. players
CAPS United players
Association football midfielders
Zimbabwe under-20 international footballers
Sportspeople from Harare